Arthur Apfel (29 October 1922 in Johannesburg – 15 September 2017) was a British figure skater. He was the 1947 World bronze medalist. He was also known for his spinning ability.

Results

References

1922 births
2017 deaths
British male single skaters
World Figure Skating Championships medalists
Sportspeople from Johannesburg